Stadionul Central may refer to:

 Stadionul Central (Balotești)
 Stadionul Central (Mangalia)
 Stadionul Central (Recea)
 Stadionul Central (Vulcan)